Malus mandshurica, the Manchurian crab apple, is a species of Malus found in China, far eastern Russia, North Korea, and Japan. Some authorities consider it to be a variety of the Siberian crab apple, Malus baccata. It is used as a rootstock for cultivated apples in China.

References

mandshurica
Crabapples